A.M. Journal Express was a short-lived free daily newspaper in Dallas, Texas, owned by American Consolidated Media. In its six-month life span, it lost under $5 million, according to company chairman Jeremy Halbreich. The paper started on November 12, 2003, and closed on April 30, 2004. When plans for the A.M. Journal Express were revealed in September 2003, The Dallas Morning News publisher A. H. Belo took action and designed their own free daily newspaper, called Quick, which hit the streets two weeks earlier than the Journal Express.

According to ACM, The Dallas Morning News took hostile actions to ensure the failure of the A.M. Journal Express, including confrontations with A.M. Journal distributors and the threatening of A.M. Journal's advertisers.

In January 2007, American Consolidated Media was acquired by Macquarie Media Group for $80 million.

Notes

Defunct newspapers of the Dallas–Fort Worth metroplex
Publications established in 2003
Publications disestablished in 2004
2003 establishments in Texas
2004 disestablishments in Texas